Sogong is a village in Panggarangan District, Lebak Regency in Banten Province. Its population is 2590.

Climate
Sogong has a tropical rainforest climate (Af) with heavy to very heavy rainfall year-round.

References

Populated places in Banten
Villages in West Java